The following article presents a summary of the 2021–22 football (soccer) season in Bangladesh, which is the 50th season of competitive football in the country.

National Team

Bangladesh  men's national football team

Results and fixtures

Friendlies

Bangladesh Premier League

The league will start on January and schedule to end TBD.

Teams
Bashundhara Kings
Bangladesh Police FC
Chittagong Abahani
Dhaka Abahani
Dhaka Mohammedan
Muktijoddha Sangsad KC
Rahmatganj MFS
Saif SC
Sheikh Jamal Dhanmondi Club
Sheikh Russel KC
Swadhinata KS
Uttar Baridhara

League table

Bangladesh Championship League

The league kicked off from 20 February 2022 and ended on 13 June 2022.

Teams
Agrani Bank Ltd. SC
Uttara FC
Gopalganj Sporting Club
Farashganj SC
Dhaka WC
NoFeL Sporting Club
T&T Club Motijheel
BFF Elite Academy FC
Fakierpool YMC
Kawran Bazar PS
Wari Club
 Fortis FC
Swadhinata KS
 Brothers Union  (will not participate in the upcoming 2021–22 Bangladesh Championship League season)

League table

Senior Division League

The league kicked off from 10 August 2022 and ended on 26 October 2022.

Teams
Arambagh KS  (couldn't participate in this edition of the league as FIFA imposed a transfer-ban on the club)
 Dhaka City FC  (withdrew due to unknown reason)
PWD Sports Club
Jatrabari KC
Mohakhali Ekadosh
Badda Jagoroni Sangsad
Bangladesh Boys Club
Koshaituli Somaj Kollayan Parishad
Somaj Kallyan KS Mugda
East End Club
Dilkusha Sporting Club
Nobabpur Krira Chakra
Basabo Torun Shangha
Sadharan Bima Corporation Sporting Club
Friends Social Welfare Organization
Victoria Sporting Club

League table

Second Division League

Domestic Cups

Independence Cup

Federation Cup

Zilla League Champions

Youth Competition Champions

Bangladeshi clubs in International Competition

Women's Football

References

External links

Football
Bangladesh
 
2022 in association football by country